Città di Castello; "Castle Town") is a city and comune in the province of Perugia, in the northern part of Umbria. It is situated on a slope of the Apennines, on the flood plain along the upper part of the river Tiber. It is connected by the SS 73 with Arezzo and the A1 highway, situated 38 km (23 mi) west. The comune of Città di Castello has an exclave named Monte Ruperto within Marche.

History

The town was founded by the ancient Umbri, an Italic tribe, on the left bank of the Tiber River. The town may have come into conflict with the nearby Etruscans. Beginning in the third century BC it became a civitates federata of Rome and was subsequently inserted into the Sexta Regio of Roman Italy. The Romans knew it as Tifernum Tiberinum ("Tifernum on the Tiber"). 

Nearby Pliny the Younger built his villa in Tuscis, which is identified with walls, mosaic floors and marble fragments surviving at a place now called Colle Plinio, the "Hill of Pliny".

In 550 A.D. Tifernum was largely destroyed during the Ostrogothic campaign by Fantalogus at the orders of Totila. The town was subsequently rebuilt by its bishop Floridus around a castle and renamed first Castrum Felicitatis by Lombards and later Civitas Castelli. By the Donation of Pepin of the Frankish king Pepin the Short in 752, it went to the Holy See.

It became an independent commune in the first half of the 12th century. Among its various rulers was Pier Saccone Tarlati di Pietramala, brother of Guido, Bishop of Arezzo. Pier Saccone sold it in 1322 to Guido Alberto de' Guidi di Modigliana. In Middle Ages the Diocese of Città di Castello included also many territories that are today in the provinces of Arezzo, Forlì-Cesena, Pesaro and Rimini. In the later Middle Ages it was governed successively by the Guelphs and Ghibellines. In 1375 Città di Castello joined the insurrection of other cities of the States of the Church. Cardinal Robert of Geneva, later Antipope Clement VII, tried to capture it using Breton mercenaries, but was repulsed. Under Pope Martin V in 1420 it was taken by the condottiero Braccio da Montone. Later Niccolò Vitelli, aided by Florence and Milan, became absolute ruler or tiranno. Antonio da Sangallo the Younger built an extensive palace for the Vitelli family.

In 1474 Sixtus IV sent his nephew Cardinal Giuliano della Rovere, later Pope Julius II, to rule the town. After fruitless negotiations he laid siege to the city, but Vitelli did not surrender until he knew that the command of the army had been given to Duke Federico III da Montefeltro. The following year Vitelli tried unsuccessfully to recapture the city. Cesare Borgia through a conspiracy in Senigallia ordered Vitellozzo Vitelli, who had inherited the city to be strangled on the evening of 31 December 1502 and Città di Castello were added to the Papal possessions.

On 11 September 1860 Città di Castello was occupied by Piedmontese troops. On 17 March 1861 it became part of the Kingdom of Italy.

Towards the end of the twentieth century, the city has seen a considerable expansion northwards toward San Giustino, with industrial parks tracking the river, railroad and main highway. In the area several kinds of mechanical goods, textiles, ceramics and furnishings are produced. Agriculture is at a very advanced level. Today it's the main economic centre in the region.

Geography

Overview
The town is located in northern Umbria, near the borders with Tuscany and Marche, and the Tiber river flows along its western side. The municipality borders with Apecchio (PU), Arezzo (AR), Citerna, Cortona (AR), Mercatello sul Metauro (PU), Monte Santa Maria Tiberina, Monterchi (AR), Montone, Pietralunga, San Giustino, Sansepolcro (AR), Sant'Angelo in Vado (PU) and Umbertide.

Frazioni
Antirata, Astucci, Badia Petroia, Badiali, Barzotti, Baucca, Belvedere, Bisacchi, Bivio Canoscio, Bivio Lugnano, Bonsciano, Caifirenze, Candeggio, Canoscio, Capitana, Celle, Cerbara, Cinquemiglia, Colcello, Coldipozzo, Cornetto, Croce di Castiglione, Fabbrecce, Fiume, Fraccano, Grumale, Lerchi, Lugnano, Madonna di Canoscio, Marchigliano, Montemaggiore, Monte Ruperto, Morra, Muccignano, Nuvole, Palazzone, Petrelle, Pettinari, Piosina, Promano, Riosecco, Roccagnano, Ronti, Rovigliano, San Biagio del Cornetto, San Leo Bastia, San Lorenzo Bibbiana, San Maiano, San Martin Pereto, San Martino di Castelvecchio, San Martino d'Upò, San Pietro a Monte, San Secondo, Santa Lucia, Scalocchio, Seripole, Terme di Fontecchio, Titta, Trestina, Uppiano, Userna, Userna Bassa, Valdipetrina, Vallurbana, Vingone, Volterrano.

Culture
The dialect is particular and derives in turn from the Romagnolo Gaelic and the eastern Tuscan dialects. The comune territory is one of the largest in Italy, for this reason dialect changes a lot according to the considered zone. Culture is linked to Marche, Romagna and Tuscany ones.

The art historian Vittorio Sgarbi has referred to the town as the place of the origin of the Renaissance or its capital.

Main sights

The city is mostly built of brick, since the local sandstone deriving from Apennines erodes very rapidly. Its principal monuments include the medieval Palazzo Comunale, the tall civic tower or Torre Comunale, and the Pinacoteca Comunale, an art museum with mostly Renaissance works by Raphael, Luca Signorelli, Andrea della Robbia, Lorenzo Ghiberti, Domenico Ghirlandaio, and others, notable for its external decorations by Giorgio Vasari.

The much reworked cathedral, from the 18th century with an unfinished 17th century façade, has an altar-front (Paliotto) of chased silver dating to the 12th century, and a crosier from the 15th. It also houses works by Niccolò Circignani, Rosso Fiorentino and Raffaellino del Colle. The bell tower is in Romanesque style of the 11th century. The cathedral's museum is home to the Canoscio hoard, a set of Late Antique silver spoons and plates with Christian motifs, as well as a silvered altarpiece donated by Pope Celestine II in the 12th century, a Madonna by Pinturicchio (1486) and Angels by Giulio Romano. It also houses a letter by Emperor Frederick Barbarossa.

Other religious structures of interest include:
Sanctuary of the Madonna di Belvedere

The city has memorialized the abstract painter and sculptor Alberto Burri, who was born in Città di Castello, with the "Fondazione Palazzo Albizzini Collezione Burri" housing a large permanent museum of his works in the former Palazzo Albizzini.

Famous inhabitants
For persons from the city, see People from Città di Castello. In addition, the following are believed to have had a local connection, usually through long residence there:
Pliny the Younger
Pope Celestine II
Monica Bellucci
Vitellozzo Vitelli
Alberto Burri
Salvatore Sciarrino
Margaret of Castello
Frankie Hi-NRG MC
Debbie McGee

Twin towns
Majano, Friuli-Venezia Giulia, Italy is the only official twin comune.

References

Notes

Sources
 Newadvent.org
Touring Club Italiano, 1966. Guida d'Italia: Umbria. pp. 136–42
Official homepage (in Italian) (in English)
Bill Thayer's site
YouTube.com

External links

  Città di Castello official website
  Città di Castello on luoghimisteriosi.it

 
Roman sites of Umbria
Cities and towns in Umbria